Ganoderma microsporum immunomodulatory protein or GMI is a protein discovered from the mushroom species Ganoderma microsporum. GMI is a pure protein composed of 111 amino acids and exists in nature as a tetramer.

Discovery 
GMI is found in the mycelium of Ganoderma microsporum. During the life cycle of G. microsporum, GMI acts as an important signaling factor in the transition from the fungi's mycelium phase to the fruiting body phase. However, the levels of GMI found in both the mycelium and fruiting body are very low.

In 2005, researchers utilized genetic and bio-engineering methods to obtain purified GMI, and proved that the protein is structurally similar to LZ-8, the first fungal immunomodulatory protein discovered in 1989. The name GMI is derived from the fact that when cultured with immune cells, GMI was found to not only increase the cells’ hormone production, but also induce higher levels of cellular activity.

References 

Proteins
Ganodermataceae
Fungi
Fungal proteins
Immunoglobulin superfamily